Aadli is an Estonian language surname meaning "titled" and "nobiliary". Notable people with the surname include:

 Argo Aadli (born 1980), Estonian actor
 Erkki Aadli (born 1974), Estonian orienteer

Estonian-language surnames